Adrián Antonio Delgado (born 14 May 1977 In Caracas to Antonio and Yaneida Delgado is a Venezuelan television actor. His stage name is a combination of his parents family names. Delgado has two sisters, one elder and one younger.

Filmography

Teatro 
 CABARET. Teatro Teresa Carreño. 2011
 Hollywood Style. Teatro Celarg 2009
 Hercules. Teatro Sambil 2008
 Una casa pa´Maita. Teatro Teresa Carreño. 2007

References 

 

1977 births
Living people
Male actors from Caracas
21st-century Venezuelan male actors
Venezuelan male telenovela actors